Beata Bartków-Kwiatkowska (born November 22, 1981 in Bielsko-Biała) is a Polish sport shooter. At the 2012 Summer Olympics, she competed in the Women's 10 metre air pistol and the Women's 25 metre pistol.

Olympic results

References

External links
pkol.pl 

Polish female sport shooters
1981 births
Living people
Olympic shooters of Poland
Shooters at the 2012 Summer Olympics
Sportspeople from Bielsko-Biała
European Games competitors for Poland
Shooters at the 2019 European Games
21st-century Polish women